Bujar Lako (1 June 1926 – 15 December 1996) was an Albanian actor.

Filmography

References

External links
 

People from Korçë
20th-century Albanian male actors
21st-century Albanian male actors
Albanian male film actors
Albanian male television actors
1946 births
2016 deaths